Archie Daniel Davies (born 7 October 1998) is an English professional footballer who plays as a defender for League of Ireland Premier Division side Dundalk.

He played youth football with Crystal Palace and Brighton & Hove Albion and had a loan spell from the latter at Whitehawk in 2017. He made his senior debut for Brighton & Hove Albion in 2019, before joining his current club, Crawley Town in August 2020. He signed for Aldershot Town in summer 2022.

Career

Brighton & Hove Albion
Davies played youth football for Crystal Palace before joining Brighton & Hove Albion at the age of 15. He signed his first professional contract with the club in 2017.

Davies joined Whitehawk on loan in August 2017, and played a total 8 league games for them.

Davies made his professional debut for Brighton & Hove Albion, on 25 September 2019 in a 3–1 defeat at home against Aston Villa in the EFL Cup.

Davies was released by Brighton in the summer of 2020 upon the expiry of his contract.

Crawley Town
Davies signed for Crawley Town on 1 August 2020 following his release from Brighton. His first appearance for Crawley on 8 September 2020 in a 2–1 EFL Trophy defeat to Gillingham. He made his league debut for the club four days later in a 2–0 defeat to Port Vale. In total he made 38 appearances across the 2020–21 season.

On 10 August 2021, Davies scored his first senior goal with a 95th-minute equaliser in a 2–2 EFL Cup draw Gillingham. Crawley lost the penalty shoot-out despite Davies scoring his penalty. He made 37 appearances during 2021–22 season. Davies was released by Crawley in June 2022.

Aldershot Town
On 16 June 2022, it was announced that Davies had joined National League club Aldershot Town on a one-year contract.

Personal life
Davies was born in St Leonards-on-Sea and grew up in St Leonards-on-Sea and Lanzarote before attending Buckswood School. He can speak Spanish.

Career statistics

References

1998 births
Living people
Sportspeople from Hastings
English footballers
Association football midfielders
Brighton & Hove Albion F.C. players
Whitehawk F.C. players
Crawley Town F.C. players
Aldershot Town F.C. players
Dundalk F.C. players
English Football League players
National League (English football) players
League of Ireland players
Expatriate association footballers in the Republic of Ireland